Prospect Hill Missionary Baptist Church (Prospect Hill Baptist Church) is a historic Baptist church building at 1601 Buena Vista in San Antonio, Texas.

The Beaux Arts style building was constructed in 1911 and added to the National Register of Historic Places in 1986.

References

Baptist churches in Texas
Churches on the National Register of Historic Places in Texas
National Register of Historic Places in San Antonio
Beaux-Arts architecture in Texas
Churches completed in 1911
20th-century Baptist churches in the United States
Churches in San Antonio